Kalaallit make up the largest group of the Greenlandic Inuit and are concentrated in Kitaa. It is also a contemporary term in the Greenlandic language for the indigenous people living in Greenland (Greenlandic Kalaallit Nunaat). The Kalaallit (singular: Kalaaleq) are a part of the Arctic Inuit. The language spoken by Inuit in Greenland is Kalaallisut, also called Greenlandic.

Name 
Probably adapted from the name Skræling, Kalaallit historically referred specifically to Western Greenlanders. 
On the other hand, Northern and Eastern Greenlanders call themselves Inughuit and Tunumiit, respectively. About 80% to 88% of Greenland's population, or approximately 44,000 to 50,000 people identify as being Inuit.

Regions
As 84% of Greenland's landmass is covered by the Greenland ice sheet, Kalaallit live in three regions: Polar, Eastern, and Western. In the 1850s some Canadian Inuit migrated to Greenland and joined the Polar Inuit communities.

The Eastern Inuit, or Tunumiit, live in the area with the mildest climate, a territory called Ammassalik. Hunters can hunt marine mammals from kayaks throughout the year.

The Northeast Greenland Inuit are now extinct. Douglas Clavering (1794–1827) met a group of twelve Inuit, including men, women and children, in Clavering Island in August 1823. There are many remains of former Inuit settlements in different locations of the now desolate area, but the population died out before mid-19th century.

Art
The Kalaallit have a strong artistic tradition based on sewing animal skins and making masks.  They are also known for an art form of figures called tupilaq, or "evil spirit object." Traditional art-making practices thrive in the Ammassalik. Sperm whale ivory remains a valued medium for carving.

See also

List of Greenlandic Inuit
Demographics of Greenland
History of Greenland

Notes

References
 Hessel, Ingo. Arctic Spirit. Vancouver: Douglas and McIntyre, 2006

External links
Kalaallit historical art collections, National Museum of the American Indian
Kalaallit archaeology art collections, National Museum of the American Indian

 
Indigenous peoples in the Arctic
Greenlandic Inuit people
Inuit groups